Craig Sangster (born 2 March 1975 in Scotland), is a Scottish former rugby union player for Glasgow Warriors at the Full Back or Centre position. Rarely he filled in at Fly-half.

Sangster played for amateur club Stirling County in two spells

At amateur district level Sangster played for Glasgow District at under 19 and under 21 grades.

While with Stirling, Sangster also played for the professional Glasgow side in two spells; the first from 1996 to 1998. He played for Glasgow in all of their Challenge Cup matches in 1996-97; and in all of their Heineken Cup matches in 1997-98.

On leaving Glasgow Warriors and Stirling County Sangster signed for Blackheath in London, England. Blackheath were then a professional side playing in the Allied Dunbar Premiership 2.

Sangster spent a year with  Blackheath before returning to Glasgow Warriors and Stirling County. He was back playing with the then Glasgow Caledonians in 2000.  He played on their Canadian tour in 2000. In 2001 he represented Caledonia Reds as an amateur district.

He played for Stirling County in the Melrose Sevens in 2003.

Sangster also played for Hamilton RFC.

He played for Falkirk RFC

Sangster joined Grangemouth Stags as Head Coach and player in 2011 and played in the RBS National Bowl in 2013.

He now plays for Bannockburn RFC.

Sangster played in the memorial match for Gordon Mackay in 2012, his old Stirling team mate. He was capped by Scotland Students and by Scotland Under-21.

References

External links 
 Glasgow v Edinburgh 2000

1975 births
Living people
Scottish rugby union players
Stirling County RFC players
Glasgow District (rugby union) players
Glasgow Warriors players
Blackheath F.C. players
Place of birth missing (living people)
Rugby union centres
Rugby union fullbacks